Charles W. Mullin (December 31, 1845 – March 8, 1919) was an American judge, lawyer and politician.

Born in Wayne County, Illinois, Mullan moved with his parents to Black Hawk County, Iowa. He went to the public school in Black Hawk County. During the American Civil War, Mullan served in the 47th Iowa Volunteer Infantry Regiment. He then studied law, went to Upper Iowa University, and was admitted to the Iowa bar in 1870. Mullan practiced law in Waterloo, Iowa. He served as solicitor for the city of Waterloo and as county attorney for Black Hawk County. Mullan also served on the Waterloo School Board. He was a Republican. From 1898 to 1902, Mullan served in the Iowa State Senate. From 1901 to 1907, Mullan served as Iowa Attorney General. Then from 1913 until his death in 1919, Mullan served as an Iowa District Court judge. Mullan died at St. Mary's Hospital in Rochester, Minnesota after undergoing surgery.

Notes

1845 births
1919 deaths
People from Wayne County, Illinois
Politicians from Waterloo, Iowa
People of Iowa in the American Civil War
Upper Iowa University alumni
Iowa lawyers
Iowa state court judges
School board members in Iowa
Iowa Attorneys General
Republican Party Iowa state senators
19th-century American judges
19th-century American lawyers